Luis Méndez (born 1 December 1969) is a Uruguayan boxer. He competed in the men's middleweight event at the 1992 Summer Olympics.

References

1969 births
Living people
Uruguayan male boxers
Olympic boxers of Uruguay
Boxers at the 1992 Summer Olympics
Place of birth missing (living people)
Middleweight boxers